Vizcatán del Ene district is one of the nine constituent districts of Satipo Province situated in the eastern part of the Department of Junín, Peru. The district was founded on October 2, 2015 by the government of President Ollanta Humala by enactment of Law Number 30346. 

In May 2021, a Communist group committede a terrorist attack in one of the regions of this district. This came to be known as the San Miguel del Ene attack.

References

States and territories established in 2015
2015 establishments in Peru